Ivan Lazarev (born 4 November 1983) is a Russian luger who has competed since 1998. A natural track luger, he won seven medals at the FIL World Luge Natural Track Championships with a three golds (Men's doubles: 2005, 2007, 2011), two silvers (Men's doubles: 2003, Mixed team: 2005), and two bronzes (Mixed team: 2009, 2011).

Lazarev also won three gold medals in the men's doubles event at the FIL European Luge Natural Track Championships (2004, 2006, 2008).

References
FIL-Luge profile
Natural track European Championships results 1970-2006.
Natural track World Championships results: 1979-2007

External links 

 

1983 births
Living people
Russian male lugers
People from Kandalaksha
Sportspeople from Murmansk Oblast